Barry Williams (born 5 March 1947) is a retired British international athlete. He competed in the men's hammer throw at the 1972 Summer Olympics.

He also represented England and won a bronze medal in the hammer throw, at the 1970 British Commonwealth Games in Edinburgh, Scotland. Four years later he competed in the hammer throw again at the 1974 British Commonwealth Games in Christchurch, New Zealand.

References

1947 births
Living people
Athletes (track and field) at the 1972 Summer Olympics
Athletes (track and field) at the 1970 British Commonwealth Games
Athletes (track and field) at the 1974 British Commonwealth Games
British male hammer throwers
English male hammer throwers
Olympic athletes of Great Britain
Place of birth missing (living people)
Commonwealth Games medallists in athletics
Commonwealth Games bronze medallists for England
Medallists at the 1970 British Commonwealth Games